Legislative elections were held in South West Africa on 20 April 1970. A whites-only election saw a victory for the National Party of South West Africa, which won all 18 seats in the Legislative Assembly.

Results

References

1970 in South West Africa
South West Africa
Elections in Namibia
1970 elections
Election and referendum articles with incomplete results